The 2002 United States elections were held on November 5, in the middle of Republican President George W. Bush's first term. Republicans won unified control of Congress. In the gubernatorial elections, Democrats won a net gain of one seat. The elections were held just a little under fourteen months after the September 11 attacks. Thus, the elections were heavily overshadowed by the War on Terror, the impending Iraq War, the early 2000s recession, and the sudden death of Democratic Senator Paul Wellstone of Minnesota about one week before the election.

Republicans won a net gain of two seats in the Senate and so gained control of a chamber that they had lost in 2001 after Senator Jim Jeffords left the Republican Party. Republicans picked up eight seats in the House of Representatives, making this one of three mid-term elections in which the party of the incumbent president did not lose seats in either the House or the Senate (the other two being 1934 and 1998). It was the sixth midterm election in which the President's party increased its number of seats in the House, after 1814, 1822, 1902, 1934, and 1998. Along with the Senate elections of 1914, 1934, 1962, 1970, 1998, 2018, and 2022 this was the eighth time that the President's party gained seats in a midterm election since the passage of the 17th amendment.

This is the only election in history where the President's party gained a seat of Congress in a midterm election, the most recent midterm in which the President's party did not lose control of at least one house of Congress, and the most recent midterm election in which a political party maintained a trifecta on the government.

Federal elections
Despite being the incumbent party in the White House, which is usually a disadvantage for the president's party during midterm congressional elections, Republicans achieved gains in both chambers of the United States Congress.

United States Senate elections

During the 2002 U.S. Senate elections, all thirty-three regularly scheduled Class II Senate seats as well as a special election in Missouri were held.

In the United States Senate elections, the Republican Party achieved an overall net gain of two seats with victories in Georgia, Minnesota, and Missouri, while the Democrats took a seat in Arkansas. Thus, the balance of power in the Senate changed from a 51–49 Democratic majority to a 51–49 Republican majority.

United States House of Representatives elections

During the 2002 House elections, all 435 seats in the House of Representatives plus 5 of the 6 nonvoting delegates from territories and the District of Columbia were up for election that year. These elections were the first to be held following redistricting in apportionment according to the 2000 United States Census.

Republicans succeeded in expanding their majority in the House of Representatives by a net gain of eight, resulting in a 229–204 Republican majority. They won the nationwide popular vote by a margin of 4.8 points. This represented just the third time since the American Civil War that the president's party picked up seats in the House of Representatives, following the 1934 and 1998 elections.

In addition to all regularly scheduled House elections, there were two special elections held, one for Oklahoma's 1st congressional district on January 8 and another for Hawaii's 2nd congressional district on November 30.

State elections

Gubernatorial elections

During the 2002 gubernatorial elections, the governorships of the 36 states, 2 territories, and the District of Columbia were up for election.

Going into the elections, Republicans held the governorships of 27 states and one territory (that being the Northern Mariana Islands); Democrats held those of twenty-one states, four territories, and the mayorship of the District of Columbia; and two governorships were held by incumbents of neither party (those being Angus King (I-Me.) and Jesse Ventura (IPM-Minn.)). Following the elections, Republicans sustained a net loss of one state governorship (but did gain the governorship of the territory of Guam); Democrats had an overall net gain of three state governorships and held on to all other territorial governorships and the mayorship of the District of Columbia; and there would be no governorships held by independents or third parties. Thus, the balance of power (excluding nonstate entities) would change from a 27–21 Republican majority to a 26–24 Republican majority.

Other statewide elections
In some states where the positions were elective offices, voters elected candidates for state executive-branch offices (lieutenant governor (though some were elected on the same ticket as the gubernatorial nominee); secretary of state; state treasurer; state auditor; state attorney general; state superintendent of education; commissioner of insurance, agriculture, or labor; etc.) and state judicial-branch offices (seats on state supreme courts and, in some states, state appellate courts).

State legislative elections

In 2002, the seats of the legislatures of forty-six states and five nonstate entities were up for election. Republicans flipped control of seven chambers (including one led by a coalition), while Democrats flipped control of two. One chamber went from Democratic to tied, while another went from Republican to tied. As a result, Republicans held a majority of state legislative seats for the first time in half a century.

Local elections
Nationwide, there were some cities, counties, school boards, special districts and others that elected members in 2002.

Mayoral elections
Various major American cities held their mayoral elections in 2002, including the following:
Augusta, Georgiaincumbent mayor Bob Young (R) won reelection against former mayor Ed McIntyre.
Dover, Delawareincumbent mayor James L. Hutchison (R) was reelected without opposition.
Independence, Missouriincumbent mayor Ron Stewart (D) was reelected.
Lexington, Kentuckyformer councilwoman Teresa Isaac (D) defeated attorney Scott Crosbie in an open-seat election to succeed outgoing mayor Pam Miller (D).
Louisvilleformer Louisville mayor Jerry Abramson (D) was elected mayor of the newly created consolidated city-county of Louisville-Jefferson County (created as the result of the merger of the Louisville City and Jefferson County governments).
New OrleansRay Nagin (D), vice president and regional general manager of Cox Communications, won an open-seat election to succeed outgoing mayor Marc Morial (D).
Providence, Rhode Islandstate representative David Cicilline (D) won an open-seat election to succeed acting mayor John J. Lombardi. Cicilline thus became the first openly gay mayor of a state capital city, and Providence would remain the largest American city to have an openly gay mayor until Sam Adams's inauguration as mayor of Portland, Oregon, on January 1, 2009.
Salem, OregonJanet Taylor was elected mayor of Salem to succeed outgoing mayor Mike Swaim.
Washington, D.C.incumbent mayor Anthony A. Williams (D) was reelected to a second term, defeating councilwoman Carol Schwartz (R).

References

External links
 United States Election 2002 Web Archive from the U.S. Library of Congress

2002 elections in the United States
2002
2002
November 2002 events in the United States